Eremophila hispida is a flowering plant in the figwort family, Scrophulariaceae and is endemic to Queensland. It is a small shrub with narrow, hairy, clustered leaves, with violet to purple flowers and is restricted to a small area in central Queensland.

Description
They also have a distinct midrib visible on the lower surface.

The flowers are borne singly in leaf axils on a very short stalk. The petal tube is purple to violet-coloured, the outside of the tube is usually hairy while the inner surface of the lobes is glabrous and the inside of the tube is filled with long, soft hairs. The 4 stamens are fully enclosed within the petal tube.

Taxonomy and naming 
The species was first formally described by Robert Chinnock in 2007 and the description was published in Eremophila and Allied Genera: A Monograph of the Plant Family Myoporaceae. The specific epithet (hispida) is a Latin word meaning "with rough hair or bristles".

Distribution and habitat
Eremophila hispida grows in mulga and Corymbia terminalis woodland in brown loam and sand, mostly near Winton.

Conservation status
Eremophila hispida is classified as "of least concern" in terms of the Queensland Nature Conservation Act.

Use in horticulture
This eremophila has rarely been cultivated but its purple flowers and contrasting leaves indicate that it may have potential as a garden plant. It can be propagated from cuttings or by grafting and grown in well-drained soil in full sun. It is drought tolerant, needing only occasional watering but it needs to be protected from frost.

References

Flora of Queensland
hispida
Plants described in 2007
Taxa named by Robert Chinnock